December is a collaborative Christmas extended play (EP) by English singer Gabrielle Aplin and Welsh singer Hannah Grace. The EP was released through Never Fade Records on 4 December 2018. It is Aplin's seventh EP, following Avalon (2017), and Grace's fourth. The album includes an original song, "December", accompanied by three cover tracks. It was re-released on 15 November 2019, featuring 2 additional covers.

Track listing

References

2018 EPs
Gabrielle Aplin albums
Christmas EPs
Collaborative albums